sympathy is Hitomi Takahashi's first album to be released under gr8! records, a division of Sony Records. The album was released on March 1, 2006, and three singles preceded it.

Overview
sympathy is the debut original studio album released by the Japanese singer Hitomi Takahashi. The album was released in Japan in two formats, CD+DVD and CD Only, both of them containing the same cover. As information about the album was unveiled, Hitomi's Official Site announced that the album song "Yakusoku" would be used as the ending theme for the Japanese TV Program "THE SUNDAY."

The album received much promotion upon its release, an example being that Hitomi appeared on TV many times a day with a message concerning her album. More attempts at promotion were made as Hitomi appeared on various radio programs. In addition to all of this, Hitomi further promoted her album by appearing in a variety of magazines.

sympathy showcases a wide variety of musical genres, mostly in the pop and rock area. Songs range from pop/rock songs, such as "Get the future", to the more rock/ballad songs like "Yakusoku". The album even contains a little country music in the song "KOTO NO HA". Overall, though, the album remains close to the genre pop/rock that the three singles released before this album contained.

Overall, reception of the album was positive, many people claiming it as wonderful and a success on Hitomi's part. However, the album did not go without complaints. The album was said to be mediocre, and that it would have been better had it been more on the rock side than pop/rock.

Track listing

CD Portion
 "Get the future" – 3:34   Lyrics, music, and arrangement by Koichi Tsutaya 
 " (Tears of the Blue Sky)" – 4:30   Lyrics by Hitomi Takahashi & Natsumi Watanabe  Music by Hidenori Tanaka  Arrangement by Hyoe Yasuhara 
 " (Lonely Crowd)" – 3:15   Lyrics by Hitomi Takahashi & mavie  Music and arrangement by Katsuhiko Kurosu 
 " (Leaves of Words)" – 5:05   Lyrics by Akiko Watanabe  Music by Jun Ichikawa  Arrangement by Masanori Shimada 
 "Evergreen" – 5:17   Lyrics by Hitomi Takahashi & Hidenori Tanaka  Music by Hidenori Tanaka  Arrangement by Tomoji Sogawa 
 "Beatin'" – 4:08   Lyrics by Hitomi Takahashi & mavie  Music and arrangement by Tomoki Kikuya 
 "" – 3:48   Lyrics by Hitomi Takahashi & mavie  Music by BOUNCEBACK  Arrangement by Gen Kushizaki 
 " (Promise)" – 5:01   Lyrics by Hitomi Takahashi & Hiroaki Hayama  Music and arrangement by Hiroaki Hayama 
 " (Another Daybreak)" – 3:27   Lyrics by Hitomi Takahashi & mavie  Music and arrangement by Shinya Saito
 "SKULL" – 2:58   Lyrics by Hitomi Takahashi & Akiko Watanabe  Music and arrangement by Hyoe Yasuhara 
 " (Our Whereabouts) -Album Version-" – 4:31   Lyrics by Yuta Nakano & shungo.  Music and arrangement by Yuta Nakano 
 "16" – 5:00   Lyrics by Hitomi Takahashi & mavie  Music by Yuta Nakano  Arrangement by Masanori Shimada

DVD Portion
 "僕たちの行方 (Bokutachi no Yukue)" (music video)
 "evergreen" (music video)
 "青空のナミダ (Aozora no NAMIDA)" (music video)

Personnel
 Hitomi Takahashi - vocals
 Koichi Tsutaya - keyboards, programming, & backing vocals (Track #1)
 A_S_E - guitars (Track #1)
 Takeshi Taneda - bass (Track #1 & #4)
 Takashi Furuta - drums (Track #1)
 Hyoe Yasuhara - keyboards & programming (Track #2 & #10)
 Kazuyoshi Baba - guitars (Track #2, #3, #4 & #8)
 Rei Shimizu - bass (Track #2 & #10)
 Kazutaka Kiritoshi - drums (Track #2, #7, #8 & #9)
 Katsuhiko Kurosu - programming (Track #3)
 Koji Igarashi - keyboards (Track #3 & #6)
 Kazuhiro Sunaga - bass (Track #3 & #8)
 Masuke Nozaki - drums (Track #3 & #5)
 Masanori Shimada - keyboards & programming (Track #4 & #12)
 Tomoyasu Kawamura - drums (Track #4)
 Tomoji Sogawa - keyboards & programming (Track #5)
 Yoshihiko Chino - guitars (Track #5)
 Naoya Emi - bass (Track #5)
 Tomoki Kikuya - programming & guitars (Track #6)
 Toshihisa Tanaka - bass (Track #6)
 Yasuo Sano - drums (Track #6)
 Marico Harada - backing vocals (Track #6)
 Gen Kushizaki (No-torious) - keyboards, programming, guitars & bass (Track #7)
 Hiroaki Hayama - keyboards & programming (Track #8)
 Shinya Saito - keyboards & programming (Track #9)
 Yutaka Ishii - guitars & bass (Track #9)
 Takamichi Tsugei - guitars (Track #10)
 Kaori Kobayashi - drums (Track #10)
 Yuta Nakano - keyboards & programming (Track #11)
 Kohei Tsuda - guitars (Track #11)
 Takashi Yonekura - guitars (Track #11)
 Mio Okamura - violins (Track #11)
 Yoshiaki Kanoh - guitars (Track #12)
 Sting Miyamoto - bass (Track #12)
 Masayuki Muraishi - drums (Track #12)

Production
 Directors of Songs - Kazuma Jo & Taku Sugawara
 Art Direction - Hiroyuki Yui (elaion Inc.)
 Design - Sachie Shibata (bold Co.,Ltd.)
 Photography - Hidemi Ogata
 Styling - Itoko Shiino
 Hair & Make-up - Mihoko Fujiwara (Ritz)
 Illustration - Frederic Thomain

Charts
Album - Oricon Sales Chart (Japan)
Oricon Sales Chart (Japan)

Singles - Oricon Sales Chart (Japan)

References 
  
  

2006 albums
sympathy
Gr8! Records albums